Cleary Lake is a lake in Scott County, in the U.S. state of Minnesota.

Cleary Lake was named for three members of the Cleary family (John, Patrick, and Peter), who lived near the lake.

References

Lakes of Minnesota
Lakes of Scott County, Minnesota